This is a Chinese name; the family name is To.
Raymond To Kwok-Wai (born 13 August 1946) is a Hong Kong contemporary dramatist, screenwriter and film director, with ancestry from Panyu, Guangzhou, China. 
Raymond's broadcast script was once broadcast in New York by Chung Wah Commercial Broadcast. He has created more than 60 stage plays, including "Born in Hong Kong", "Boundless Movement", "Dark Tales", "Fuso passing", "I Have a Date with Spring", "Mad Phoenix", "Walled City", "Love Avalokitesvara "," Miss Du ", " Forever"," Adventure, "," Broadcasting Lovers "and" Sentimental Journey "etc.
Among those works, "I am a Hong Konger" was tour performed in Europe. 
In addition, Raymond has written "Under the Roof", "Below the Lion Rock" and other popular series for RTHK.
Raymond is not only a prolific and exhaustive screenwriter. Besides, he is the composer and lyrics writer for the scripts, such as "Sentimental Journey", "In love with Sister Liu", etc.

Early life
Raymond To has a sister, Mei Zi (formerly Duyan Zhi), who is an announcer. During his childhood, Raymond had the reputation of being a "broadcasting prodigy" after he participated in Radio Television Hong Kong (RTHK) and Rediffusion Television programmes. In his early years, he performed in movies including "The affairs of Miss Ping" and "The Fatherless Son". 

In 1971 and 1982, Raymond graduated from the Department of Geography at University of Hong Kong and the Hong Kong Institute of Education.

Career
After graduation, he became a high school teacher at Ho Lap College and was responsible for the school drama club, one of the four kings - Andy Lau, being one of his students. At this time, he was already an amateur writer. He began his second career as a professional playwright when, in 1979, his short play "Ball" was selected by the Hong Kong Repertory Theatre for excellence in script writing. and for which he was invited to participate in the performance of "Rickshaw Boy/Camel Xiangzi".

On 3 June 1995, Raymond To, together with Ko Tin Lung and Clifton Ko founded the "Spring Stage Production Company". In addition to being the theatre company's playwright, he is also an artistic director. Although the majority of his original work is for the stage, some have been adapted for film, with To being responsible for many of these adaptions. Raymond To was elected as the president of the Hong Kong Film Writers' Guild. During 2000, Raymond directed his own work for the first time, "Forever and Ever", to much acclaim.

Filmography (1956–2005)

Awards and nominations

References

 
 
  (Chinese Web.)

External links

 HK cinemagic entry

Living people
Hong Kong dramatists and playwrights
Hong Kong screenwriters
Hong Kong film directors
1946 births